René Gabriel Bonnière (born 10 March 1928) is a Canadian film director and editor, originally from France. He has had a prolific career, working in television and film in both French and English productions.

Biography
Bonnière was born in Lyon, France. He first began his film career in France as a director for the French army, working alongside Henri Colpi and composer Georges Delerue. He then worked as an assistant to filmmaking pioneer Marcel L'Herbier.

He emigrated from France in May 1955, arriving in New York City with his wife, Claude, on the SS Flandre.  Bonnière spent six months working at a bank on Wall Street before looking north for a return to the film industry. He contacted filmmaker F. R. Crawley and the National Film Board of Canada (NFB); Crawley met him in New York and invited him to move to Canada.

From 1956 to 1971, Bonnière worked for Crawley Films, directing dozens of films. His first works were Beaver Dam (short), Maîtres artisans du Canada and The Legend of the Raven. He also collaborated with Pierre Perrault, considered one of Canada's finest filmmakers.

In 1963, he directed Amanita Pestilens, the first Canadian film in colour and the first to be shot simultaneously in English and French.

In a profile on Bonnière, Cinémathèque québécoise notes that his work for Crawley helped bridge the gap between Canada's French- and English-language films.

He also worked for the NFB, producing several documentaries, many about Canada's indigenous communities.

Personal life
Bonnière is married to artist Claude Bonnière, who won a 1982 Daytime Emmy Award for art direction for the ABC Afterschool Special, My Mother Was Never a Kid.

Filmography
Bonnière has worked as a director and editor in both television and film.

Television

Films

References

External links

Films by René Bonnière at the NFB

1928 births
Living people
Mass media people from Lyon
French film directors
Film directors from Toronto
French film editors
Canadian film editors
Canadian television directors
French emigrants to Canada
Military personnel from Lyon